Jach'a Tira (Aymara jach'a big, tira cradle, "big cradle", also spelled Jachcha Tira) is a mountain in the La Paz Department in the Andes of Bolivia which reaches a height of approximately . It is located in the Loayza Province, Malla Municipality, northeast of the community of Bella Vista.

References 

Mountains of La Paz Department (Bolivia)